Alistair Graham (born 1942) is a British civil servant who was Chairman of the Committee on Standards in Public Life.

Alistair or Ally Graham may also refer to:

Ally Graham (born 1966), Scottish footballer
Ally Graham (footballer, born 1993), Scottish footballer
Alastair Graham (1906–2000), Scottish zoologist and malacologist
Ali G, television character created by Sacha Baron Cohen